Oberstdorf (Low Alemannic: Oberschdorf) is a  municipality and skiing and hiking town in Germany, located in the Allgäu region of the Bavarian Alps. It is the southernmost settlement in Germany and one of its highest towns.

At the center of Oberstdorf is a church whose tall spire serves as a landmark for navigating around town.  The summits of the Nebelhorn and Fellhorn provide dramatic panoramic views of the alps.  The Nebelhorn can be reached with a big cable car.  Visitors can ride a unique diagonal elevator to the top of the Heini-Klopfer-Skiflugschanze.

Geography

Administrative divisions 
Oberstdorf consists of the village of Oberstdorf (813 metres above sea level, survey point by the Roman Catholic church) and five other villages: 
 Kornau , 915 m. In the vicinity is the Söllereckbahn and the Chapel of St. Fabian and St. Sebastian which is rich in art treasures.
 In Reichenbach (population: 226) is the 450-year-old Chapel of St. James and the Moorwasser swimming pool.
 The little hamlet of Rubi has 175 inhabitants. 
 Typical of Schöllang are the farm houses around the Baroque onion tower of the parish church. In the vicinity is the 1531 castle church. 
 The village of Tiefenbach takes its name from trees called Bergkiefer. The village lies on a terrace above the Breitach stream. Tiefenbach has a centuries-old spa tradition thanks to its sulphur spring. As early as the late 15th century counts and other high-ranking people convalesced here to cure their illnesses.

Valleys 
There is a large number of valleys in the area around Oberstdorf, many of which are not only scenic, but are often starting points for walks in the mountains. The following list shows the main valleys together with their side valleys:

 Breitach
 Starzlach
 Stillach (Stillachtal or Birgsautal)
 Rappenalpbach (Rappenalptal)
 Warmatsgundbach (Warmatsgundtal)
 Iller 
 Oybach (Oytal)
 Trettach 
 Dietersbach
 Traufbach

Oytal and Dietersbachtal are separated by the Höfats and Rauheck. Gerstruben, Germany's highest village, lies at the entrance to the Dietersbachtal.

The Rappenalptal is the longest and runs from Germany's southernmost village, Einödsbach, past the Haldenwanger Eck, Germany's southernmost point. At the end of the valley the Schrofen Pass leads to Austria.

Mountains 
The Allgäu Alps in the area around Oberstdorf attain heights of over 2,600 metres and belong to the Northern Limestone Alps. The best known summits in Oberstdorf are:

 Fellhorn 2,038 m (Blumenberg of the Allgäu)
 Himmelschrofen 1,791 m
 Höfats 2,259 m (the most prominent Allgäu "grass mountain")
 Kratzer 2,427 m
 Großer Krottenkopf 2,656 m (highest mountain of the Allgäu Alps)
 Mädelegabel 2,645 m (lies on the Heilbronn Way)
 Nebelhorn 2,224 m (with cable car)
 Rubihorn 1,957 m (local mountain)
 Schattenberg 1,845 m (by the eponymous ski jump)
 Schneck 2,268 m (unique shape)
 Trettachspitze 2,595 m
 Hoher Ifen 2,230 m

Lakes 
There are numerous lakes at various heights around Oberstdorf:

 Christlessee, drinking water quality, in the Trettach valley
 Engeratsgundsee, east of the Großer Daumen
 Freibergsee, bathing lake in the Stillach valley
 Unterer and Oberer Gaisalpsee
 Guggersee by the Krumbach Ridgeway
 Hermannskarsee between the Großer Krottenkopf and the Marchspitze
 Koblatsee in the Nebelhorn area
 Laufbichelsee also on the Koblat of the Nebelhorn
 Moorweiher on the Krappberg
 Rappensee at 2,047 m
 Schlappoldsee by the middle station of the Fellhornbahn
 Seealpsee above the Oytal

Main sights 

 St. Anna-Kapelle, a chapel in Rohrmoos
 17th and 18th century farmhouses
 Breitachklamm near Tiefenbach, a gorge created by the river Breitach
 Heini-Klopfer-Skiflugschanze, the third largest ski flying hill in the world
 Schattenbergschanze, a ski jumping hill (the opening of the Four Hills Tournament)

History 
Findings show that the Oberstdorf area was already inhabited from the Stone Age to the Roman Empire. When the Romans had abandoned the area east of the Upper Rhine and north of the Upper Rhine in the 3rd century, various Germanic groups migrated into the area, which were later called Alemanni.

Oberstdorf was first mentioned in 1141. King Maximilian, the later emperor, granted Oberstdorf in 1495 the right to hold a market and the High Court. In 1518 Count Hugo of Montfort built a spa in Tiefenbach at the sulphur spring, which is regarded as a precursor of today's spa facility.

Oberstdorf’s experience in the Third Reich is recounted in A Village in the Third Reich.

During World War II the mountains around the village were used to train mountain troops of the Wehrmacht. At the end of the war French and Moroccan troops were stationed there.

Sports
In December, before every New Year, Oberstdorf hosts the first part of the ski jumping Four Hills Tournament on the Schattenberg large hill. There is also a ski flying hill, Heini-Klopfer-Skiflugschanze, about seven kilometres to the south. ABC's Wide World of Sports famously featured the Oberstdorf ski flying hill when Vinko Bogataj fell during his jump in 1970, thus becoming known as "The Agony of Defeat".

Oberstdorf hosted the Nordic skiing World Championships in 1987, 2005 and 2021. The town has also hosted several stages of the Tour de Ski, a cross-country skiing stage event.

Germany's modern figure skating center was built on the outside of the town. It has three covered rinks and  some of them are accessible to the public, for recreational skating. It is a popular destination with European skaters for training camps.

Oberstdorf hosts the annual Nebelhorn Trophy figure skating competition and has hosted the German Figure Skating Championships twelve times. It has also hosted the 1982, 2000, and 2007 World Junior Figure Skating Championships.  One of the two ISU adult figure skating competitions (for skaters aged 28 and older) is held in Oberstdorf each May.

Mountain bikers start their Transalp tour in Oberstdorf on the Schrofen Pass to Riva del Garda.

Notable people 

 Andreas Heckmair, who participated in the first ascent of the North Face of the Eiger in 1938 lived in Oberstdorf until his death in 2005.
 Gertrud von Le Fort (1876-1971) author, lived in Oberstdorf from 1925 until her death
 Toni Steurer, athlete
 Chonrad Stoeckhlin (1549–1587), German herdsman who was accused and executed for witchcraft 
 Friedrich-Jobst Volckamer von Kirchensittenbach (1894–1989), German general 
 The 2010 German Vancouver Olympic Team Members Christina Geiger and Gina Stechert (both Alpine Skiing), David Speiser (Snowboard Cross), Johannes Rydzek (Nordic Combined), Nicole Fessel and Katrin Zeller (both Cross-Country Skiing), Daniel Herberg (Curling) and Michael Neumayer (Ski jumping) live in Oberstdorf
 Pavlo Skoropadskyi (Hetman of Ukraine)
 Thorsten Schäfer-Gümbel (born 1969), German politician (SPD)
 Karl Geiger (born 1993), ski jumper
 Maximilian Günther (born 1997), racing driver
 Aljona Savchenko, (born 1984) is a Ukrainian-born German pair skater, living in Oberstdorf.

Sister cities
 Megève, France.

References

External links

 Official website

Ski areas and resorts in Germany
Oberallgäu